Al Qubbah or El Gubba is a town in eastern Libya. Once capital of Quba District.

It is the largest populated place between Derna, and Bayda.

History
It was named after Giovanni Berta during the Italian colonial times.

Notes

Populated places in Derna District
Baladiyat of Libya